Fiyoaree School is a school in Fiyoaree, an island of Gaafu Dhaalu Atoll, Maldives. The school was opened on 17 September 1980 under the name of "Fiyoaree Makthab". The name of Fiyoaree Makthab to Fiyoaree School changed in the year 1983. Until August 2006 Fiyoaree School was a government funded community school located in South Huvadhoo Fiyoaree island. The main aim of Fiyoaree School is to give modern education with Islamic manners.

Schools in the Maldives